John Stack  (1906–1972) was an aerospace engineer. He won the Collier trophy, in 1947 and 1951.

Life
Stack was born in Lowell, Massachusetts, and graduated from Massachusetts Institute of Technology. He worked at Langley Research Center from 1928 to 1962, and Republic Aircraft Corporation, from 1962 to 1971. He died in 1972.

He worked on transonic flight. He was part of the Bell X-1 team. He worked with the Variable Density Tunnel, on compressible airflow.

Works
The Compressibility Factor National Advisory Committee for Aeronautics, 1935
The Compressibility Bubble National Advisory Committee for Aeronautics, 1935
 John Stack, Albert E Von Doenhoff,  Tests of 16 related airfoils at high speed, NACA-report-492, 1935
John Stack, W. F. Lindsey, Tests of N-85, N-86, and N-87 Airfoil Sections in the 11-inch High-speed Wind Tunnel, National Advisory Committee for Aeronautics, 1938

References

External links

1972 deaths
1906 births
Collier Trophy recipients
People from Lowell, Massachusetts
Massachusetts Institute of Technology alumni
Langley Research Center
American aerospace engineers
20th-century American engineers